Misa Tango or MisaTango may refer to:
Misa Tango, 1997 work by Luis Bacalov
MisaTango, 1996 work by Martín Palmeri